"Watching Too Much Television" is the 46th episode of the HBO original series, The Sopranos and the seventh episode of the show's fourth season. Its teleplay was written by Nick Santora and Terence Winter from a story by Robin Green, Mitchell Burgess, Terence Winter, and David Chase. It was directed by John Patterson and originally aired on October 27, 2002.

Starring
 James Gandolfini as Tony Soprano
 Lorraine Bracco as Dr. Jennifer Melfi 
 Edie Falco as Carmela Soprano
 Michael Imperioli as Christopher Moltisanti
 Dominic Chianese as Corrado Soprano, Jr. *
 Steven Van Zandt as Silvio Dante
 Tony Sirico as Paulie Gualtieri
 Robert Iler as Anthony Soprano, Jr. 
 Jamie-Lynn Sigler as Meadow Soprano
 Drea de Matteo as Adriana La Cerva
 Aida Turturro as Janice Soprano
 Federico Castelluccio as Furio Giunta
 Vincent Curatola as Johnny Sack
 Steven R. Schirripa as Bobby Baccalieri
 Joe Pantoliano as Ralph Cifaretto

* = credit only

Guest starring

Synopsis
Adriana gets the idea from a TV crime drama that spouses cannot be forced to testify against each other, so she surprises Christopher by proposing that, after two years' engagement, they should get married. But when she confesses that she might not be able to have children, he storms out. Tony and Silvio urge him to marry her regardless. Fortified by heroin, he tells her he will. But she learns from a lawyer that the TV drama was wrong: in a major trial, she can be made to testify. At her bridal shower, she cheerlessly unwraps her presents.

Furio Giunta invents a pretext to phone Carmela and tells her he has a pretty picture of her from the house-warming, but next morning he declines to enter the house, saying there is a problem in the car.

Brian Cammarata casually mentions a bogus housing deal he knows about, but Tony and Ralphie take it seriously and carry out their own scheme to defraud the U.S. Department of Housing and Urban Development. They make use of Dr. Ira Fried, Assemblyman Ronald Zellman, and Maurice Tiffen, a black activist. Some derelict houses are purchased. Tony takes A.J. for a drive, showing him the houses to illustrate his family's proud history of dedication to work.

One of the houses is occupied by black squatters who have turned it into a crack den. Tony puts pressure on Zellman to evict them: Zellman puts pressure on Tiffen; Tiffen demurs at the use of violence, but four armed teens are sent and the squatters are violently evicted. Based on false appraisals, a large loan is obtained from HUD. Fried, Zellman, and Tiffen get their cuts; Tony presents Brian with a Patek Philippe watch. Zellman and Tiffen recall that they were idealists together in the '60s and briefly lament the corruption of their ideals.

Paulie is released from prison. There is a big welcome-back party and an envelope of cash from Tony. But Paulie is still resentful that Tony never contacted him when he was in prison, and speaks of this to Johnny Sack. He tells him that Tony has a new property scam. Johnny confirms that their conversations are secret, and tells Paulie that Carmine Lupertazzi thinks very highly of him.

Zellman diffidently informs Tony that he is having a serious relationship with his ex-girlfriend Irina. Tony does not seem to mind. One day he finds a pretext to go to Zellman's house and sees Irina again. One night, drunk and overcome by emotion, he drives to the house and barges up to the bedroom where he finds Zellman half-undressed. Tony takes off his belt and lashes him with it, saying, "All the girls in New Jersey, you had to fuck this one?"

Final appearances

Ronald Zellman – Newark assemblyman, and associate of Tony Soprano.

Title reference
 Adriana watches the TV series Murder One and learns that she doesn't have to turn state's evidence against Christopher if they get married. But, her friend tells her that according to an episode of Murder, She Wrote, that is not always the case.

Other cultural references
 Silvio makes a reference to the movie Papillon to Paulie when they first meet each other after he gets out of jail.
 Paulie tells Johnny Sack he missed Good & Plenties while in prison.
 In separate scenes Adriana watches Murder One and The A-Team on television.
 Tony listens to WCBS-FM.
 Paulie and Johnny eat at the River Café restaurant in Brooklyn.
Maurice Tiffen's line "Nobody said anything about violence.  We renounced it, remember?  When Eldridge went into the codpiece business." refers to black radical Eldridge Cleaver and his line of suits from the 70s.

Connections to prior episodes
 Like he did with Meadow in the pilot episode, Tony takes A.J. to see the church Corrado Soprano, Sr. built when he first came to the U.S. from Avellino.

Music 
The song played to welcome Paulie back ("Paulie's song") is "Nancy (With the Laughing Face)" by Frank Sinatra; it's never explained why it's significant to him.
The song which is played over the end credits is "Oh Girl" by The Chi-Lites. The song was also heard earlier at the Russian bathhouse, where Tony, Zellman, and Tiffen discuss it.
 In the diner scene where Brian, Tony, and Ralph discuss the HUD scam, a muzak version of "Rikki Don't Lose That Number" by Steely Dan plays in the background.
 When Zellman and Tony are talking in the changing room after the sauna, the Booker T. & the M.G.'s song "Green Onions" is playing.
During a discussion between Tony and Christopher, the Foghat song "Slow Ride" is playing in the background.
On Tony's car radio, en route to Assemblyman Zellman's house, "Oh Girl" is preceded by "You Ain't Seen Nothing Yet" by Bachman–Turner Overdrive.
At the Bada Bing, the song "Drive" by Nashville Pussy is playing.

External links
"Watching Too Much Television"  at HBO

The Sopranos (season 4) episodes
2002 American television episodes
Television episodes written by David Chase
Television episodes written by Terence Winter
Television episodes directed by John Patterson (director)